Thomas Joseph Froggett (born 5 May 1988) is an English former first-class cricketer.

Froggett was born at Wakefield in May 1988. He later studied at St John's College, Oxford where he played first-class cricket for Oxford University. He made two first-class appearances for Oxford, playing in The University Matches of 2007 and 2008 against Cambridge University. Playing as a wicket-keeper, he scored 46 runs with a high score of 21 not out, in addition to taking three catches and making a single stumping in his capacity as wicket-keeper.

References

External links

1988 births
Living people
People from Wakefield
Alumni of St John's College, Oxford
English cricketers
Oxford University cricketers